Lo Wu Control Point is a Hong Kong immigration control point in Lo Wu, New Territories. It sits within the Frontier Closed Area that runs along the border with mainland China. Its counterpart across the border is the Luohu Port in Shenzhen, China.

The control point is integrated with Lo Wu station of the Mass Transit Railway (MTR).

In 2015, 83.2 million people passed through Lo Wu Control Point, making it the busiest control point in Hong Kong. It is open from 06:30 to 00:00 midnight daily.

References

Closed Area
North District, Hong Kong
China–Hong Kong border crossings